Rangiora Recreation Ground (also known as the MainPower Oval through a sponsorship deal with local company MainPower) is a cricket ground in Rangiora, Canterbury, New Zealand.

The Recreation Ground is recorded as being in existence since the early 1870s, and used for cricket since 1891. It first held a first-class match when Canterbury played Central Districts in the 2003/04 State Championship. Since the 2011 Christchurch earthquake damaged Lancaster Park beyond repair, Canterbury have played many of their first-class home matches in Rangiora.  Canterbury first played a List A match there in the 2003/04 State Shield when they played Auckland, with eight matches in that format having been held there in the 2011-12 Ford Trophy. as well as a handful of Twenty20 matches.

Two Youth One Day Internationals have been played at Rangiora Recreation Ground, both in the 2010 Under-19 World Cup when England Under-19s played West Indies Under-19s and Australia Under-19s.  The ground has also been used a home venue for Canterbury Women in the State League since the 2006/07 season.

The Canterbury Country Hawke Cup team use Rangiora Recreation Ground as their home ground. They successfully defended their title there against North Otago in 2014–15.

References

External links
Rangiora Recreation Ground at ESPNcricinfo
Rangiora Recreation Ground at CricketArchive

Cricket grounds in New Zealand
Sports venues in Canterbury, New Zealand
Rangiora